Ashley Vernon McGrath (born 20 May 1983) is a retired indigenous Australian rules footballer who played for the Brisbane Lions in the Australian Football League.

Selected in the 2000 AFL Draft with the thirteenth pick overall, the Brisbane Lions recruited the talented forward, where he made his AFL debut late in 2001. He continued to establish himself in the side and by 2003, was a regular member, being part of the Lions' third straight AFL premiership.

In 2005 he found more opportunities up forward with the retirement of other forwards Craig McRae and Alastair Lynch.

McGrath has two brothers who were also listed at AFL clubs, Toby and Cory.

During periods of the 2008 season, McGrath was trialed as a rebounding half back flanker with varying degrees of success.

McGrath's 2009 season was of two halves. His first half of the season was smeared with poor performances and ineffective disposals. But after the mid-season break, McGrath had a career-best game where he had 30 disposals against Geelong in Round 15. He then went on to play the remainder of the season averaging more than 20 disposals a game.

McGrath is also a cousin with former AFL player Dion Woods.

In round 13, 2013, McGrath, playing his 200th AFL game, kicked a goal after the siren to win the Lions the game against Geelong, becoming only the 36th AFL player to do so. This match became known as the "Miracle on Grass".

McGrath was selected as the Australia international rules football team's goalkeeper for the 2013 International Rules Series in Ireland. Australia lost the series 2-0, with a 173-72 aggregate score. McGrath was the only Brisbane Lions player selected for the team.

McGrath announced his retirement on 21 August 2014; he retired as the last remaining player from any of the Brisbane Lions' triple premiership-winning sides.

Statistics

|-
|- style="background-color: #EAEAEA"
! scope="row" style="text-align:center" | 2001
|style="text-align:center;"|
| 9 || 1 || 0 || 0 || 1 || 0 || 1 || 0 || 0 || 0.0 || 0.0 || 1.0 || 0.0 || 1.0 || 0.0 || 0.0
|-
! scope="row" style="text-align:center" | 2002
|style="text-align:center;"|
| 9 || 9 || 0 || 0 || 41 || 12 || 53 || 17 || 18 || 0.0 || 0.0 || 4.6 || 1.3 || 5.9 || 1.9 || 2.0
|- style="background-color: #EAEAEA"
! scope="row" style="text-align:center" | 2003
|style="text-align:center;"|
| 9 || 22 || 13 || 9 || 150 || 51 || 201 || 62 || 39 || 0.6 || 0.4 || 6.8 || 2.3 || 9.1 || 2.8 || 1.8
|-
! scope="row" style="text-align:center" | 2004
|style="text-align:center;"|
| 9 || 19 || 12 || 14 || 130 || 50 || 180 || 50 || 46 || 0.6 || 0.7 || 6.8 || 2.6 || 9.5 || 2.6 || 2.4
|- style="background-color: #EAEAEA"
! scope="row" style="text-align:center" | 2005
|style="text-align:center;"|
| 9 || 21 || 35 || 15 || 123 || 58 || 181 || 43 || 48 || 1.7 || 0.7 || 5.9 || 2.8 || 8.6 || 2.0 || 2.3
|-
! scope="row" style="text-align:center" | 2006
|style="text-align:center;"|
| 9 || 11 || 14 || 9 || 64 || 27 || 91 || 23 || 24 || 1.3 || 0.8 || 5.8 || 2.5 || 8.3 || 2.1 || 2.2
|- style="background-color: #EAEAEA"
! scope="row" style="text-align:center" | 2007
|style="text-align:center;"|
| 9 || 15 || 22 || 17 || 83 || 41 || 124 || 36 || 23 || 1.5 || 1.1 || 5.5 || 2.7 || 8.3 || 2.4 || 1.5
|-
! scope="row" style="text-align:center" | 2008
|style="text-align:center;"|
| 9 || 15 || 3 || 6 || 104 || 78 || 182 || 45 || 35 || 0.2 || 0.4 || 6.9 || 5.2 || 12.1 || 3.0 || 2.3
|- style="background-color: #EAEAEA"
! scope="row" style="text-align:center" | 2009
|style="text-align:center;"|
| 9 || 24 || 7 || 5 || 255 || 148 || 403 || 140 || 53 || 0.3 || 0.2 || 10.6 || 6.2 || 16.8 || 5.8 || 2.2
|-
! scope="row" style="text-align:center" | 2010
|style="text-align:center;"|
| 9 || 18 || 3 || 4 || 192 || 111 || 303 || 86 || 52 || 0.2 || 0.2 || 10.7 || 6.2 || 16.8 || 4.8 || 2.9
|- style="background-color: #EAEAEA"
! scope="row" style="text-align:center" | 2011
|style="text-align:center;"|
| 9 || 21 || 26 || 12 || 188 || 91 || 279 || 69 || 75 || 1.2 || 0.6 || 9.0 || 4.3 || 13.3 || 3.3 || 3.6
|-
! scope="row" style="text-align:center" | 2012
|style="text-align:center;"|
| 9 || 12 || 11 || 8 || 113 || 69 || 182 || 49 || 32 || 0.9 || 0.7 || 9.4 || 5.8 || 15.2 || 4.1 || 2.7
|- style="background-color: #EAEAEA"
! scope="row" style="text-align:center" | 2013
|style="text-align:center;"|
| 9 || 20 || 19 || 11 || 129 || 65 || 194 || 44 || 45 || 1.0 || 0.6 || 6.5 || 3.3 || 9.7 || 2.2 || 2.3
|-
! scope="row" style="text-align:center" | 2014
|style="text-align:center;"|
| 9 || 5 || 4 || 5 || 21 || 9 || 30 || 10 || 10 || 0.8 || 1.0 || 4.2 || 1.8 || 6.0 || 2.0 || 2.0
|- class="sortbottom"
! colspan=3| Career
! 213
! 169
! 115
! 1594
! 810
! 2404
! 674
! 500
! 0.8
! 0.5
! 7.5
! 3.8
! 11.3
! 3.2
! 2.3
|}

References

External links

1983 births
Indigenous Australian players of Australian rules football
Australian rules footballers from Western Australia
Brisbane Lions players
Brisbane Lions Premiership players
South Fremantle Football Club players
People from Northam, Western Australia
Living people
Australia international rules football team players
One-time VFL/AFL Premiership players